You Make Me Hate Music is the second studio album by the indie rock band Fine China. It was produced and recorded by Jason Martin of Starflyer 59 and Terry Scott Taylor of Lost Dogs and Daniel Amos.

Track listing
 "Hug Every Friend"
 "The Unsuccessful"
 "Rock Can't Last Forever"
 "Don't Say Nothing"
 "You Were a Saint"
 "Boo to the Freaks"
 "The World Wants Me Dead"
 "Your Heart Was Made of Gold"
 "You Ain't Happy"
 "Forget the Experts"

References

2002 albums
Fine China (band) albums
Tooth & Nail Records albums